For a dish, see Cordon bleu.

Cordon, officially the Municipality of Cordon, is a 2nd class municipality in the province of Isabela, Philippines. According to the 2020 census, it has a population of 46,477 people.

Being the town nearest to Santiago City Proper, it became a favored destination for local businessmen. It houses the better resorts and hotels in Southern Isabela such as Punta Amelita and Villa Diana.

Geography
It is bounded by Santiago City to the east, Ramon, Isabela to the north, Quirino Province (Municipality of Diffun) to the south, and Nueva Vizcaya Province (Municipality of Diadi) to the west.

The present area of Cordon is totally different from its previous area as defined in its charter, the law creating this town, much of the previous Carig town (Modern day Santiago City) territories were annexed to Modern Cordon including the Magat Reservoir Territories (Barangay Taliktik and Barangay Dallao) and the diadi region barangays (San Juan, Aguinaldo, Villamarzo, Camarao, and Rizaluna).

The map of Modern Isabela Province and Modern Municipality of Cordon has been changed showing the new boundaries of each towns and cities.

Barangays

Cordon is politically subdivided into 26 barangays. These barangays are headed by elected officials: Barangay Captain, Barangay Council, whose members are called Barangay Councilors. All are elected every three years.

Climate

Demographics

Economy 

As a suburb of first class city Santiago, Cordon benefits from rapid growth of commercial demand in the district. Toyota Isabela, the first branch of Japan-based car company in the province, has opened an outlet in Cordon. Some hotels and "stop overs" are also located in Cordon.
Recently, the Primark Town Center in Cordon has opened its doors to the public. This new mall houses Savemore Market, McDonald's, and many more.

Government

Local government
The municipality is governed by a mayor designated as its local chief executive and by a municipal council as its legislative body in accordance with the Local Government Code. The mayor, vice mayor, and the councilors are elected directly by the people through an election which is being held every three years.

Elected officials

Congress representation
Cordon, belonging to the fourth legislative district of the province of Isabela, currently represented by Hon. Alyssa Sheena P. Tan.

Education
The Schools Division of Isabela governs the town's public education system. The division office is a field office of the DepEd in Cagayan Valley region. The office governs the public and private elementary and public and private high schools throughout the municipality.

References

External links

 Local Government Unit of Cordon
 Municipal Profile at the National Competitiveness Council of the Philippines
 Cordon at the Isabela Government Website
 Local Governance Performance Management System
 [ Philippine Standard Geographic Code]
 Philippine Census Information

Municipalities of Isabela (province)